Mark Paul Deren (born June 23, 1980), more commonly known as MADSTEEZ, is an artist and designer based in California.

His visual style has attracted clients such as Nike, Inc., Target Corporation, Red Bull, Boost Mobile, Honda, Boosted, Volkswagen, MCA Records, Interscope Records, Stüssy, Evisu, Ben Sherman, Capita Snowboards, Armada Skis, Rusty, Salomon, Lemonade Magazine, Wallin Surfboards, ActivEmpire, ActionSports Group, So Sweet Records, 411VM, Palace 5ive, Rip Curl and Bl!SSS Magazine.

As an artist, he has held solo exhibitions in New York City, Los Angeles, and Tokyo. He has had group showings in London, Germany, Seattle, Portland, Vancouver, Calgary and Art Basel, Miami.

Timeline

In 2005, Deren was featured in The New York Times.

In 2006, under his moniker "MADSTEEZ", Deren made an exclusive content deal with cellular company Boost Mobile, "offering its youth wireless customers an opportunity to own a piece of limited edition artwork on their Boost Mobile phone for a fraction of the gallery price."

In 2007 he completed a creative collaboration with the actor/artist Dennis Hopper.

In July 2009, Deren partnered with Nike, Inc. and released a signature series shoe named the "STINKWEEN".

Acclaim

Madsteez has received recognition in the following publications and websites: The New York Times, Flaunt, Dazed and Confused, Nylon, Black Book, Vapors, Paper, Mass Appeal, Death and Taxes, Time Out, Stuff, URB, Vice, Apparel News, AlternativePress, Happy, SG, Get On, XLR8R, Lemonade, OC Weekly, 411, Riviera, woostercollective.com, thefader.com, dorkmag.com, knowngallery.com, highsnobiety.com and boostedmobile.com.

References

External links
 https://web.archive.org/web/20101214020945/http://boostmobilecommunity.com/ReadMore.aspx?blogid=108
 Higgs Phillip (November 10, 2005), "The Jolt of Spray Paint on Snow", The New York Times
 Meisner Jill (October 31, 2006), Boost Mobile and Madsteez Align to Offer New Art Medium For Youth, ecoustistics.com
 http://inside.nike.com/blogs/nke6-en_US/2009/07/22/stinkween-xtravaganza

1980 births
Living people
Artists from California